The 1960 All-Big Eight Conference football team consists of American football players chosen by various organizations for All-Big Eight Conference teams for the 1960 NCAA University Division football season.  The selectors for the 1960 season included the Associated Press (AP).

All-Big Eight selections

Backs
 John Hadl, Kansas (AP-1 [QB])
 Mel West, Missouri (AP-1)
 Curtis McClinton, Kansas (AP-1)
 Tom Watkins, Iowa State (AP-1)

Ends
 Dan LaRose, Missouri (AP-1)
 Jerry Hillebrand, Colorado (AP-1)

Tackles
 Billy White, Oklahoma (AP-1)
 Harold Beaty, Oklahoma State (AP-1)

Guards
 Joe Romig, Colorado (AP-1) (College Football Hall of Fame)
 Paul Henley, Missouri (AP-1)

Centers
 Fred Hageman, Kansas (AP-1)

Key
AP = Associated Press

See also
1960 College Football All-America Team

References

All-Big Seven Conference football team
All-Big Eight Conference football teams